The following is an alphabetical list of topics related to the nation of Grenada.

0–9

.gd – Internet country code top-level domain for Grenada
1983 Invasion of Grenada

A
Afro-Grenadians
Air Force of Grenada
Airports in Grenada
Americas
North America
North Atlantic Ocean
West Indies
Caribbean Sea
Antilles
Lesser Antilles
Islands of Grenada
Anglo-America
Antilles
Atlantic Ocean
Atlas of Grenada

B
Birds of Grenada
British West Indies

C
Capital of Grenada:  Saint George's
Caribbean
Caribbean Community (CARICOM)
Caribbean Sea
Categories:
:Category:Grenada
:Category:Buildings and structures in Grenada
:Category:Communications in Grenada
:Category:Economy of Grenada
:Category:Education in Grenada
:Category:Environment of Grenada
:Category:Geography of Grenada
:Category:Government of Grenada
:Category:Grenada stubs
:Category:Grenada-related lists
:Category:Grenadian culture
:Category:Grenadian people

:Category:Society of Grenada
:Category:Health in Grenada
:Category:History of Grenada
:Category:Politics of Grenada
:Category:Sport in Grenada
:Category:Transport in Grenada
commons:Category:Grenada
Cities of Grenada
Coat of arms of Grenada
Commonwealth of Nations
Commonwealth realm of Grenada
Communications in Grenada
Cuisine of Grenada
Culture of Grenada

D
Demographics of Grenada
Diplomatic missions in Grenada
Diplomatic missions of Grenada

E
Economy of Grenada
Education in Grenada
Elections in Grenada
English colonization of the Americas
English language

F

Fédon's rebellion
Flag of Grenada
Foreign relations of Grenada
Football in Grenada

G
Geography of Grenada
Government of Grenada
Grenada
Grenada at the Olympics
Grenada United Labour Party
Grenadians in the United Kingdom
Gross domestic product

H
Health in Grenada
Hinduism in Grenada
History of Grenada
Brenda Hood
Hospitals in Grenada

I
Indo-Grenadians
International Organization for Standardization (ISO)
ISO 3166-1 alpha-2 country code for Grenada: GD
ISO 3166-1 alpha-3 country code for Grenada: GRD
ISO 3166-2:GD region codes for Grenada
Internet in Grenada
Invasion of Grenada, 1983
Islam in Grenada
Islands of Grenada:
Grenada island
Adam Island
Anthony Rock, Grenada
Bacolet Island
Bird Island, Grenada
Black Rock, Grenada
Caille Island
Calivigny Island
Carriacou
Conference Island
Diamond Island (Grenadines)
Fota Island, Grenada
Frigate Island, Grenada
Gary Island
Glover Island, Grenada
Green Island, Grenada
Hog Island, Grenada
Hope Island, Grenada
Jack Adam Island
Kick 'em Jenny submarine volcano
Large Island
Les Tantes
Levera Island
Little Martinique
Little Tobago, Grenada
Mabouya Island
Marquis Island
Mushroom Island
Pearls Rock
Petite Dominique
Petite Martinique
Ramier Island
Redoda
Ronde Island
Saline Island
Sandy Island, Grenada
Soubisse Island
Sugar Loaf Island, Grenada
The Sisters, Grenada
White Island, Grenada

J

K

L
Languages of Grenada
Law enforcement in Grenada
Lesser Antilles
LGBT rights in Grenada (Gay rights)
Lists related to Grenada:
Diplomatic missions of Grenada
List of airports in Grenada
List of birds of Grenada
List of cities in Grenada
List of countries by GDP (nominal)
List of Grenada-related topics
List of Grenadian records in athletics
List of Grenadian records in swimming
List of Grenadian writers
List of hospitals in Grenada
List of islands of Grenada
List of mountains of Grenada
List of political parties in Grenada
List of rivers of Grenada
List of volcanoes in Grenada
Topic outline of Grenada

M
Military of Grenada
Monarchy of Grenada
Mount Saint Catherine (Grenada)
Mountains of Grenada
Music of Grenada

N
National Democratic Congress
New National Party
North America
North Atlantic
Northern Hemisphere

O
Organisation of Eastern Caribbean States (OECS)

P
Parishes of Grenada
Parliament of Grenada
Political parties in Grenada
Politics of Grenada
Prime Minister of Grenada
Public holidays in Grenada
Independence Day (Grenada)
Public services in Grenada

Q

R
Rivers of Grenada

S
The Scout Association of Grenada
Senate of Grenada
Saint George's – Capital of Grenada
St. George's University
States headed by Elizabeth II

T
Topic outline of Grenada
Transport in Grenada

U
United Nations, member state since 1974
United States invasion of Grenada
United States-Grenada relations

V
Volcanoes in Grenada

W
West Indies
Western Hemisphere

Wikipedia:WikiProject Topic outline/Drafts/Topic outline of Grenada
Windward Islands

X

Y

Z

See also

Commonwealth of Nations
List of Caribbean-related topics
List of international rankings
Lists of country-related topics
Topic outline of geography
Topic outline of Grenada
Topic outline of North America
United Nations

References

External links

 
Grenada